National Debt Act is a stock short title used in the United Kingdom for Acts of Parliament relating to the national debt.

List
The National Debt Reduction Act 1786 (26 Geo 3 c 31)
The National Debt Commissioners Act 1818 (58 Geo 3 c 66)
The National Debt Reduction Act 1823 (4 Geo 4 c 19)
The National Debt Reduction Act 1866 (29 & 30 Vict c 11)
The National Debt Act 1958 (7 & 8 Eliz 2 c 6)
The National Debt Act 1972 (c 65)

The National Debt Acts 1870 to 1893 is the collective title of the following Acts:
The National Debt Act 1870 (33 & 34 Vict c 71)
The Sinking Fund Act 1875 (38 & 39 Vict c 45)
The National Debt Act 1881 (44 & 45 Vict c 55)
The Revenues, Friendly Societies, and National Debt Act 1882 (45 & 46 Vict c 72) (Part III)
The National Debt (Conversion of Stock) Act 1884 (47 & 48 Vict c 23)
The National Debt and Local Loans Act 1887 (50 & 51 Vict c 16)
The National Debt (Conversion) Act 1888 (51 & 52 Vict c 2)
The National Debt (Supplemental) Act 1888 (51 & 52 Vict c 15)
The National Debt Redemption Act 1889 (52 & 53 Vict c 4)
The National Debt Act 1889 (52 & 53 Vict c 6)
The National Debt (Conversion of Exchequer Bonds) Act 1892 (55 & 56 Vict c 26)
The National Debt (Stockholders Relief) Act 1892 (55 & 56 Vict c 39)
The National Debt Redemption Act 1893 (56 & 57 Vict c 64)

See also
List of short titles

References

Lists of legislation by short title